Paul Richard Long (born February 8, 1944) is a former NBA and ABA basketball player. He played professionally for the Detroit Pistons, Kentucky Colonels and the Buffalo Braves.

Biography
Long was born in Louisville, Kentucky and graduated from Waggener High School in Louisville.  He attended Virginia Polytechnic Institute and State University in Blacksburg, Virginia and Wake Forest University in Winston-Salem, North Carolina.

He was drafted with the second pick in the fifth round of the 1967 NBA Draft by the Detroit Pistons. In his first NBA season, Long averaged 3.6 points and 0.8 assists per game. Long then played for the Kentucky Colonels of the ABA in his second season, averaging 3.9 points and 1.3 assists per game. He played for the Pistons again in his third season, averaging 3.3 points and 0.7 assists per game. In his final NBA season, Long played for the Buffalo Braves, averaging 4.5 points and 0.8 assists per game.

References

External links 
 Basketball-Reference.Com

1944 births
Living people
American men's basketball players
Basketball players from Louisville, Kentucky
Buffalo Braves players
Detroit Pistons draft picks
Detroit Pistons players
Kentucky Colonels players
Shooting guards
St. Louis Hawks draft picks
Virginia Tech Hokies men's basketball players
Wake Forest Demon Deacons men's basketball players